Lisa Raymond was the defending champion and successfully defended her title by defeating Amanda Coetzer 6–3, 6–2 in the final.

Seeds
The top two seeds received a bye into the second round.

Draw

Finals

Top half

Bottom half

References
 Main and Qualifying Rounds

Women's Singles
2003 WTA Tour